The Afghanistan men's national basketball team is the men's national basketball team of Afghanistan and is controlled by the Afghanistan National Basketball Federation. Afghanistan joined FIBA and became a member of FIBA Asia in 1968. In 2010, Afghanistan won the 2010 South Asian Games, becoming the first Afghan sports team to win gold in the nations history.

History

Early history
Basketball was first played in Afghanistan in 1936. In 1966, the Afghanistan National Olympic Committee (ANOC) founded the first national basketball team after receiving challenges from India and Pakistan. Tom Gouttierre, an American Peace Corps volunteer and coach of the team at Habibia High School, became the first coach. Using detailed, confidential instructions from John Wooden, the Afghan team became the only other to run the famous UCLA zone press.

Although the international games were canceled, in 1969 Gouttierre returned on a Fulbright Fellowship and again became the Habibia coach, and in 1970 Bill Bradley of the New York Knicks tutored the team while visiting the country. That year China challenged the ANOC. Because of the lack of preparation time, Gouttierre decided that current and former Habibia players were the best choice for a second Afghan national team. Using the zone press, it defeated a much larger Chinese team in Parwan Province in the Afghan team's first international victory.

FIBA Asia Cup
Afghanistan has failed to qualify for the FIBA Asia Cup, while as well as only entering in the qualification rounds only once in 2013 when they entered in the South Asian Basketball Association Qualifying Round. Afghanistan would defeat Nepal before losing to India and failing to qualify for the Asia Cup. This is there only appearance in FIBA Asia Cup qualification rounds to date.

Asian Games
Afghanistan has made two brief appearance in the Asian Games in 2006 and 2010. Both times the men's national team would struggle for success and failing to qualify outside the first round in both years respectively. The 2010 edition would be marked as the last time Afghanistan has played any competitive men's national teams games.

South Asian Games
Afghanistan would see their best success in international competition in the form of the 2010 edition of the South Asian Games. They would defeat India and claim gold in what has been their only appearance in the South Asian Games to date.

Competitive record

Summer Olympics

FIBA World Cup

FIBA Asia Cup

Asian Games

1970-2002 : Did not qualify
2006 : 13th
2010 : 13th
2014 : Did not qualify
2018 : To be determined

South Asian Games

Honours
South Asian Games
Gold Medal: 2010

Coaches
Head Coach:* Mamo Rafiq – 2007-now

Assistant Coach: * Abdul Wasi Pazhman - 2010

Assistant Coach: * Leo Balayon - 2009

Team

Current roster
The following twelve players were named to the roster for the 2010 Asian Games.

Depth chart

See also
 Afghanistan women's national basketball team

External links
Asia-basket - Afghanistan Men National Team
Presentation on Facebook

Videos
 Afghanistan Basketball Team  Youtube.com video

References

Men's national basketball teams
Basketball
Basketball teams in Afghanistan
Basketball in Afghanistan
1966 establishments in Afghanistan